Calodesma kedar is a moth of the family Erebidae. It was described by Herbert Druce in 1900. It is found in Colombia.

References

Calodesma
Moths described in 1900